Anagalidae is an extinct family of mammals closely related to rodents and lagomorphs. Members of the family are known from Paleocene to Oligocene deposits in China and Mongolia.

Genera 
The family contains the following genera:

 Anagale
 Anagalopsis
 Anaptogale
 Chianshania
 Diacronus
 Eosigale
 Hsiuannania
 Huaiyangale
 Interogale
 Linnania
 Qipania
 Stenanagale
 Wanogale
 Zofiagale

References 

Euarchontoglires
Prehistoric mammal families
Paleocene first appearances
Oligocene extinctions
Taxa named by George Gaylord Simpson